Mushowani Stars F.C. are a football team from Madziva, Zimbabwe, currently playing in the Zimbabwean Division One.

They were founded in 2011 and began play in the third tier of Zimbabwe's football pyramid and gained promotion in 2013.

The Stars won the 2018 Division One North, gaining promotion to the Premier Soccer League. They are the second club from Mashonaland to play in the top flight.

In 2019, The Stars were relegated after finishing at the bottom of the Premier Soccer League.

References

Football clubs in Zimbabwe
Association football clubs established in 2011
2011 establishments in Zimbabwe